Kayserops is a trilobite in the order Phacopida (family Acastidae), that existed during the lower Devonian in what is now Germany. It was described by Delo in 1935, and the type species is Kayserops kochi, which was originally described under the genus Cryphaeus by Kayser in 1883. The generic name is derived from the name of the species' author. The type locality was the Rhenish Massif.

References

External links
 Kayserops at the Paleobiology Database

Acastidae
Fossil taxa described in 1935
Devonian trilobites of Europe
Fossils of Germany